Santiago Daniel Martinez Roa (born 16 August 1995) is a Paraguayan footballer who plays for Vllaznia Shkodër in the Albanian Superliga as a midfielder.

Club career
On 31 August 2015, Martinez signed a one-year contract with Albanian club Vllaznia Shkodër for an undisclosed fee. He made his Albanian Superliga debut twenty days later, playing full-90 minutes in the 2–0 defeat of Vllaznia against Flamurtari Vlorë. On 4 November, Martinez scored his first goal as a Vllaznia player, scoring the second goal of the match against Apolonia Fier in the second match of the second round of 2015–16 Albanian Cup, which was proved to be the winner as Vllaznia passed to the quarter-finals. He was released during the winter transfer window.

Career statistics

References

External links

1995 births
Living people
Paraguayan footballers
Kategoria Superiore players
Association football midfielders
KF Vllaznia Shkodër players